Henry Duys Jr. (October 17, 1924 – May 11, 2007) was an American sailor. He competed in the Dragon event at the 1948 Summer Olympics.

References

External links
 

1924 births
2007 deaths
American male sailors (sport)
Olympic sailors of the United States
Sailors at the 1948 Summer Olympics – Dragon
People from Montclair, New Jersey
Sportspeople from Essex County, New Jersey